A number of steamships have been named Santagata. including –

, an Italian cargo ship in service 1935–43
, an Italian cargo ship in service 1949, later  (1950)

Ship names